is a railway station operated by Yokohama Minatomirai Railway's Kodomonokuni Line located in Aoba-ku, Yokohama, Kanagawa Prefecture, Japan. It is 1.8 kilometers from the terminus of the Kodomonokuni Line at Nagatsuta Station.

History
Onda Station was opened on March 29, 2000.

Lines
Yokohama Minatomirai Railway
Kodomonokuni Line

Station layout
Onda Station has an elevated island platform serving two tracks.  The station building is normally unattended.

Platforms

References
 Harris, Ken and Clarke, Jackie. Jane's World Railways 2008-2009. Jane's Information Group (2008).

External links
 Onda Station 

Railway stations in Kanagawa Prefecture
Railway stations in Japan opened in 2000